The women's 5000 metres event at the 2005 Summer Universiade was held on 19 August in Izmir, Turkey.

Results

References
Finals results
Full results

Athletics at the 2005 Summer Universiade
2005 in women's athletics
2005